What follows is a list of chasmata on Mars.  A chasma is a deep, steep sided, elongated depression similar to a canyon on Earth.

See also 
List of Valles on Mars

References

External links
http://planetarynames.wr.usgs.gov/

Mars